Antonije  I Sokolović was the Archbishop of Peć and Serbian Patriarch from 1571 to 1574. He was the second primate of the restored Serbian Patriarchate of Peć, and nephew of previous Serbian Patriarch Makarije I.

Antonije was born into the Serbian Sokolović family that gained prominence during the course of the 16th century. Its Christian branch gave several Serbian Patriarchs and Metropolitans, while a second branch (which converted to Islam) gave several viziers of the Ottoman Empire, including the Grand Vizier Mehmed Sokolović (1565–1579). During the patriarchal tenure of his uncle Makarije I (1557–1571), Antonije became Metropolitan of Herzegovina. In 1571, the old patriarch fell ill and convoked a church synod in the Banja Monastery near the city of Priboj. There he relinquished his throne, and Metropolitan Antonije was elected his successor and new Serbian Patriarch. He lived in the Patriarchal Monastery of Peć. In that time, western eparchies of the Serbian Patriarchate were affected by the Ottoman–Venetian War (1570–1573) and massive demographic migrations. Patriarch Antonije stayed at his throne until death in 1574.

References

Sources

External links
 Official site of the Serbian Orthodox Church: Serbian Archbishops and Patriarchs

Antonije I
16th-century Eastern Orthodox bishops
16th-century Serbian people
16th century in Serbia
Year of birth unknown
1574 deaths
Ottoman Serbia
16th-century people from the Ottoman Empire